Aquinas College, locally abbreviated as Aquinas, is an independent Roman Catholic single-sex primary and secondary day and boarding school for boys, located at Salter Point, a suburb of Perth, Western Australia.

Aquinas opened in 1938, when the headmaster, boarders and day students from Christian Brothers' College, Perth (CBC Perth) moved to the new campus at Salter Point. The history of Aquinas begins with CBC Perth which was founded in 1894 on St Georges Terrace in the Perth. Aquinas was the beneficiary of CBC Perth's history, honours and achievements for the period 1894–1937.

The campus at Aquinas was built on elevated land which is part of the  site at Salter Point.

Currently, Aquinas College accepts day students from Kindergarten to Year 12 and boarding students from Years 7 to 12. School fees range from $5,937 for a Kindergarten day student to $46,404 for a Year 12 international boarding student. The campus includes expansive sporting grounds, and boarding facilities for 210 students.

The College is affiliated with the Public Schools Association (PSA), the Association of Independent Schools of Western Australia, the Association of Heads of Independent Schools of Australia, and the Independent Primary School Heads of Australia.

History

Foundation 

The Christian Brothers opened Christian Brothers College (CBC Perth), on 31 January 1894. CBC Perth was built on the corner of St Georges Terrace and Victoria Avenue in Perth. The college was also commonly called CBC Terrace. CBC Perth was the first Christian Brothers school as well as the second oldest high school and the second oldest boarding school in Western Australia.

The Brothers were invited to the colony by Bishop Matthew Gibney who knew of the work of the Brothers in Ireland, England, and in the eastern colonies of Australia.

At first, CBC Perth  was a day school. However, due to the rapid population growth in Western Australia during the gold rush, the Christian Brothers were pressured to allow boarders to live in makeshift conditions at the college. The first boarding students were enrolled in June 1896. Accommodation at the site was very limited and overcrowded. In 1917, Brother Paul Nunan, headmaster of the college, set-about acquiring a larger property away from the city center in order to reside the whole school on a much larger campus.

College schism
At first, the brothers entered into negotiations for the purchase of 8 hectares (20 acres) at Point Heathcote on the Swan River. The negotiations fell through and in 1928 the brothers purchased 95 hectares (234 acres) on the Canning River, just east of the Riverton Bridge, and they named the property Clune Park. The following year the Great Depression started and plans to develop this site were shelved.

In 1936, at the instigation of Paul Keaney, the superior of nearby Clontarf Orphanage, 62.4 hectares (154 acres) were purchased from the Manning family at Mount Henry Peninsula on the Canning River at a cost of £9,925.

In April 1937, builders Snooks and Sons successfully tendered to build the college at a cost of £21,350. Earlier that year, the work of clearing the grounds and preparing the site was taken up vigorously with squads of boys from the old college playing a major role.

In 1937, CBC Perth began to splinter. Boarders and some day boys started moving to the fast developing Aquinas College campus at Salter Point. In 1937, the PSA committee agreed to transfer PSA membership and records of CBC Perth to Aquinas. Although CBC Perth continued as a day school until 1961, Aquinas inherited the college colours red and black, as well as the college honour boards, achievements and history for the period 1894–1937. The inheritance was largely due to the driving efforts of Brother C.P. Foley who was headmaster of CBC Perth and the founding headmaster of Aquinas. Brother Foley was steadfast Aquinas was not a new Christian Brothers school. The brothers obeyed and in the ensuring schism the heritage of CBC Perth was removed. CBC Perth was no longer a member of the PSA. The colours of CBC Perth became blue, light blue, and green, and the college raised new honour boards from 1938 onwards. In 1962 CBC Perth moved to the new campus at Trinity College by the Swan River on the East Perth foreshore.

Aquinas
The Aquinas College foundation stone was laid on 11 July 1937, and the school opened in February 1938 with 160 boarders and 55-day pupils. Brother C.P. Foley was the first headmaster. The Catholic Archbishop of Perth, Redmond Prendiville, addressed the headmaster and students on 19 November 1938:
"With the proud traditions of St Georges Terrace to sustain it, and with the additional advantages of new quarters and ideal surroundings, I have no doubt that Aquinas College will achieve still greater results in the moral and intellectual training of good Catholics and good citizens".

The Edmund Rice Administration wing was built in 1937. The main wing was brick in the late tradition of Federation Romanesque architecture, similar in style to CBC Perth. In its early years, the college extensively used wood framed and galvanized iron clad buildings for both dormitories and classrooms in order to cope with the steadily growing number of pupils.

1951–1979
In 1951, the college's premier oval, which is overlooked by the Edmund Rice Administration wing was named Memorial Oval to commemorate Aquinians who lost their lives at war. A scoreboard was constructed on the oval and is named after Brother C. P. Foley the first headmaster of Aquinas.

The first major classroom block was built in 1955, and named the 'Murphy Wing' in honour of Brother V. I. Murphy who was headmaster of the college from 1951 to 1956.

The construction of the McKenna wing, which was named after Brother V. C. McKenna who was the deputy headmaster of the college from 1963 to 1966 was completed in 1962, which was soon followed by the junior school in 1963, the Chapel in 1966 and the completion of the main boarding wing in 1967.

In 1975, the swimming pool was constructed, it was one of the first 50-metre swimming pools to be constructed in schools. This was followed by the Redmond Learning centre (library) in 1975, which was named after Brother Redmond who was on staff at Aquinas for over 45 years.

1980–2000 

In 1980 the College embarked on a further expansion which saw the addition, between 1981 and 1983, of the senior classroom block, the manual arts building, the art center and finally, the gymnasium.

Because of ever increasing pressure on enrolments in the school and the need to involve married and single lay staff in the care of boarders, the college built new boarding accommodation in 1986 and renovated buildings to provide needed classrooms.

In 1987, the Aquinas College board was established with the responsibility for the day-to-day educational needs of the students – this area includes all teaching staff, the headmaster and the head of residential facilities. The major responsibilities of the board include forming policy, planning future developments, and financial management.

At first all teachers at Aquinas were Christian Brothers. The brothers were gradually replaced by lay-teachers. By 2011, there were only two Christian Brothers actively teaching at the college. The first lay-headmaster of Aquinas, Robert White, was appointed in 2000.

Recent years 
The main entrance of the college was remodelled in 2003, with the cupola from the original Christian Brothers College building on St Georges Terrace as the focal point. The drive has five pillars with dates engraved in them that are significant in the college's history, and a large wall with large brick sections and smaller sections – which symbolise the highs and lows that the college has been through.

In 2004, the Aquinas College Foundation was established, it exists under the auspices of the Christian Brothers, this unit is responsible for acquiring (through donations) and providing the funds necessary to operate, maintain and expand the school. The Foundation operates independently from the Board to ensure a sound financial future for the College, however it does work collaboratively with the College to assist in achieving the College's vision.

2006 saw the college embark on further expansion. Churack Pavilion was constructed on the banks of Memorial Oval and the school canteen was relocated to the farside of the Murphy wing.

At the beginning of 2011, the Brother Paull Centre was opened on the south-east side of the school. The state-of-the-art facility includes specialist classrooms and playing arenas for badminton, basketball and volleyball.

In late 2016 work started on a fourth boarding house named Brothers' House which was completed in mid-2017. Gibney, Pinder Boor and Nunan are also being refurbished in stages, with the Nunan due to be finished in mid 2018.

Headmasters

Campus

The land, which falls within the Manning ward of the City of South Perth, is valued at A$1.2 billion. All of the land belongs to the school which manages and funds the area – including the Mount Henry Peninsula.

The campus comprises a number of buildings and sporting facilities necessary for the day-to-day educational needs of the students. Two of these buildings are of historical significance, the Edmund Rice Administration Wing and the Chapel, which are listed with the Heritage Council of Western Australia.

The region is recognised as a Bush Forever site and is listed on the Register of the National Estate.

The land is managed as a reserve with the Department of Environment and Conservation, Swan River Trust, National Heritage Trust and the City of South Perth for heritage conservation, education and passive recreation values. The college works collaboratively with the Swan River Trust and the City of South Perth on projects relating to the Mount Henry Peninsula including the Mount Henry Peninsula management plan.

Memorial Oval
The decision to commemorate the oval to the servicemen of Aquinas by building a war memorial oval at the front of the main building was undertaken in by the Old Aquinians association in 1940. An appeal to fund the war memorial oval raised £5000, Memorial Oval was subsequently opened on 11 November 1951 as a tribute to the servicemen among the Old Aquinians. Outside of the school's usage the ground is used for first-class women's cricket matches between the Western Fury and other state teams.

Boarding

When Aquinas opened in 1938, it started with 173 boarders; there are currently 216 boarders residing at the college. In 2007, international students were required to pay an extra $4,903 in lieu of government subsidies and extra administration costs, which brought fees for international students at Aquinas to $29,435.

All boarders live in one of the four boarding residences on the property.

Sport
In 1905, CBC Perth (Aquinas) was a founding member with The Church of England Grammar School (Guildford Grammar School), The High School (Hale School), and The Alexander Scotch College (Scotch College) of the Public Schools Association of Western Australia. In the early years of the PSA, rivalry between the four schools was increasingly competitive. The honour of each school was closely linked with performance on the sporting field. Anglican, Catholic and Presbyterian sectarianism had a huge cultural impact, and the Christian Brothers and students of CBC Perth perceived themselves as underdogs who had to work hard to build traditions at the school:
... we had no traditions to speak of. They had yet to be made – but the builders were even then stripping to the waist. We were late comers into the arena [Hale School was established in 1858] , and were despised, an object of scorn and derision, for we had hardly a scholastic attainment, or a single athletic performance to our credit. The stream of prosperity on which you now float so magnificently was not won without labour and effort. – Jack Savage, 1938

When Aquinas opened in 1938, the brothers and students who made the move from the city also took the sporting records, achievements, and PSA membership of CBC Perth. In 1962, CBC Perth moved from St Georges Terrace to the riverside of East Perth and became Trinity College. When Trinity joined the PSA in 1968 the two schools immediately became arch-rivals with each school claiming the heritage of CBC Perth from 1894–1937. Meanwhile, there were no doubts in the minds of Aquinas students when the crowds at PSA inter-school athletics meetings shouted, "Kill the Micks", they meant Aquinas and not Trinity, given the overwhelming dominance of Aquinas over the rest of the PSA competition.

Aquinas competes in seasonal PSA inter-school sports, as well as one day PSA events which include golf, sailing and surfing. The junior school participates in sailing, softball and squash programs outside the PSA sporting competition.

PSA premierships 
Aquinas has won the following PSA premierships. Premierships won prior to 1938 were done so by CBC Perth.

Community service
The service-learning program at Aquinas was implemented in 1997. Social justice has been part of the religious education program since the mid-1980s.

The college's students were the first to participate in the Red Cross soup patrol, the Adult Migrant conversational English program, and the Kindred Family support program. The college won Volunteering WA's difference award in 1998 and 2001 for innovative and outstanding service to the community. In 2002, the college became the first school in Australia to implement a graduate requirement of community service for senior students.

Drama and the arts 
Aquinas has a strong arts program which has grown over recent years. The majority of these activities take place in the Mary Kerr building, named after a long serving former music teacher. Each year, there is a visual arts exhibition, displaying work from arts students, whilst there are many evenings throughout the year where bands and choirs perform.

The highlight of the Drama calendar at Aquinas is the senior school production. This annual event sees students from year 10 to 12 perform a well known musical, presented in the college gymnasium. The production runs over 3 to 4 nights, from Wednesday to Saturday.

Notable alumni 

Alumni of Aquinas College are called an Old Aquinians. Alumni may elect to join the Old Aquinians Association, an incorporated organisation that represents the former students of the College. The association exists to provide fellowship to former students, and to support the College in the provision of scholarships and financial assistance to families in need. Aquinas has had many athletes among its alumni, including inaugural Fremantle Football Club captain Ben Allan, Brownlow medallist Simon Black, Brownlow medallist Nathan Fyfe, eight-time Olympian Tom Hoad and former test cricketers Justin Langer and Terry Alderman. It has also educated businessman Trevor Flugge, and the leader of the WA Coffin Cheaters motorcycle club, Eddie Withnell.

The Aquinas campus has produced four Rhodes scholars: P. D. Durack (1949), M. C. Cullity (1958), W. G. Jack (1987) and John McAnearney (2009).

Notable Old Aquinians include:
 Terry Alderman – Australian test cricketer
 Ben Allan – AFL footballer
 Liam Baker - AFL footballer
 Cameron Bancroft – Australian test cricketer
 Peter Bell – AFL footballer
 Simon Black – AFL footballer and Brownlow Medal winner
 Fred Chaney Jr – Cabinet minister
 John Chaney – Justice of the Supreme Court of WA
 Michael Chaney – Chairman of Woodside Energy and Wesfarmers
 Nathan Coulter-Nile – Australian cricketer
 Patrick Cripps – AFL footballer and Brownlow Medal winner
 Paul Duffield – AFL footballer
 Peter Durack – Attorney-General of Australia
 Herb Elliott, AC – Olympic athlete, world records holder, and businessman
 Nathan Fyfe – AFL footballer and two time Brownlow Medal winner
 Eric Heenan – Justice of the Supreme Court of WA
 Tom Hoad – Olympic water polo player
 Brad Hogg – Australian test cricketer
 Zack Holmes – rugby union player 
 Daniel Kerr – AFL footballer
 Peter Klinken - scientist
 Justin Langer – Australian Test Cricketer
 Rene Le Miere – Justice of the Supreme Court of WA
 Sean L'Estrange – Cabinet Minister, Mines & Petroleum; Finance; Small Business
 Paul Lockyer – reporter of news
 Quinten Lynch – AFL footballer
 Logan McDonald - AFL footballer
 Mark Priestley – actor
 John Quigley – legislator and barrister
 Deven Robertson - AFL footballer
 Corey Shervill – basketball player
 Peter Smedley – CEO of Colonial Mutual
 Ben Wyatt – WA Treasurer
 Cedric Wyatt – Aboriginal rights activist
 Elliot Yeo – AFL footballer
 Aran Zalewski – Australian hockey player

See also 

 List of boarding schools in Australia
 List of schools in the Perth metropolitan area
 Catholic education in Australia

References

Bibliography 
 Carigg, Roger (1961). Christian Brothers' College, Perth : transference of an historic college of the institute in Western Australia.
 Massam, Katharine (1998). On High Ground: Images of One Hundred Years at Aquinas College, Western Australia. Perth, Western Australia: University of Western Australia Press.
 Paull, Kevin (2001). Beyond dreams in stone: a history of the Christian Brothers' colleges in Western Australia, 1894–2000. Perth, Western Australia: Trustees of the Christian Brothers in WA Inc.
 Pollard, Robert James (196-). A history of C.B.C. Perth from its beginning to the present Trinity College.
 Taylor, Greg (1959). The history of the Christian Brothers' College, St. George's Terrace, Perth (1894–1958).
 Unknown Author (2000). Canning Bridge School – History of Aquinas and Canning Bridge schools opened in 1936.

External links 

 
 
 

 
Boarding schools in Western Australia
Boys' schools in Western Australia
Catholic boarding schools in Australia
Congregation of Christian Brothers secondary schools in Australia
Educational institutions established in 1938
Junior School Heads Association of Australia Member Schools in Western Australia
Catholic secondary schools in Perth, Western Australia
Public Schools Association (Western Australia)
Catholic primary schools in Perth, Western Australia
Congregation of Christian Brothers primary schools in Australia
State Register of Heritage Places in the City of South Perth
1938 establishments in Australia